Firespawn is a Swedish death metal band from Stockholm, formed in 2012 by Alex Impaler of Necrophobic, Lars-Göran Petrov and Victor Brandt, both of Entombed A.D. Originally called Fireborn, the group "wanted to play faster and harder death metal than in our other bands". The later addition of guitarist Fredrik Folkare of Unleashed and Necrophobic and drummer Matte Modin of Defleshed, completed the band's line-up.

On 7 August 2015, the debut 7" Lucifer Has Spoken was released. In November 2015, the band released their debut album, Shadow Realms, on Century Media. The music was written by Victor Brandt and the lyrics were written by both Alex Impaler and Victor Brandt.

On 28 April 2017, the band released their second studio album, entitled The Reprobate, again via Century Media. The band released its third album, Abominate in 2019 on Century Media.

Personnel
 Victor Brandt – guitar (2012–present)
 Fredrik Folkare – guitar (2012–present)
 Alex Impaler – bass (2012–present)
 Matte Modin – drums (2012–present)

Former members
 Lars-Göran Petrov – vocals (2012–2021; his death)

Discography

Studio albums

Singles
"Lucifer Has Spoken" (7", 2015)

References

Swedish death metal musical groups
Musical groups established in 2012
Musical groups from Stockholm
Century Media Records artists
2012 establishments in Sweden